Alfred Ernst Rosenberg ( – 16 October 1946) was a Baltic German Nazi theorist and ideologue. Rosenberg was first introduced to Adolf Hitler by Dietrich Eckart and he held several important posts in the Nazi government. He was the head of the NSDAP Office of Foreign Affairs during the entire rule of Nazi Germany (1933–1945), and led Amt Rosenberg ("Rosenberg's bureau"), an official Nazi body for cultural policy and surveillance, between 1934 and 1945. During World War II, Rosenberg was the head of the Reich Ministry for the Occupied Eastern Territories (1941–1945). After the war, he was convicted of crimes against peace; planning, initiating and waging wars of aggression; war crimes; and crimes against humanity at the Nuremberg trials in 1946. He was sentenced to death and executed on 16 October 1946.

The author of a seminal work of Nazi ideology, The Myth of the Twentieth Century (1930), Rosenberg is considered one of the main authors of key Nazi ideological creeds, including its racial theory, persecution of the Jews, Lebensraum, abrogation of the Treaty of Versailles, and opposition to what was considered "degenerate" modern art. He is known for his rejection of and hatred for Christianity, having played an important role in the development of German nationalist Positive Christianity.

Early life

Family 
Rosenberg was born on 12 January 1893 in Reval, now Tallinn (the capital of modern Estonia), then in the Governorate of Estonia (Russian Empire). His mother Elfriede (née Siré), who had French and German ancestry, was the daughter of Louise Rosalie (née Fabricius), born near Leal (modern Lihula, Estonia) in 1842, and of the railway official Friedrich August Siré, born in Saint-Petersburg (Russian Empire) in 1843. Born in the same city in 1868 and confirmed in Reval at 17 in 1885, Elfriede Siré married Woldemar Wilhelm Rosenberg, a wealthy merchant from Reval, in the Lutheran Church of Saint Peter and Saint Paul (St-Petersburg) in 1886. His paternal grandfather, Martin Rosenberg, was a master shoemaker and elder of his guild. Born in Riga in 1820, and probably partly of Latvian descent, he had moved to Reval in the 1850s, where he met Julie Elisabeth Stramm, born in Jörden (Estonia) in 1835. The two married in the German St. Nicholas parish of Reval in 1856. His mother died two months after his birth.

The Hungarian-Jewish journalist Franz Szell, who was apparently residing in Tilsit, Prussia, Germany, spent a year researching in Latvian and Estonian archives before publishing an open letter in 1936, with copies to Hermann Göring, Joseph Goebbels, Foreign Minister Konstantin von Neurath and others, accusing Rosenberg of having "no drop of German blood" flowing in his veins. Szell wrote that among Rosenberg's ancestors were only "Latvians, Jews, Mongols, and French." As a result of his open letter, Szell was deported by Lithuanian authorities on 15 September 1936. His claims were repeated in the 15 September 1937 issue of the Vatican newspaper L'Osservatore Romano. Alfred Rosenberg was indeed of Baltic German, French, and probably also of Estonian and Latvian descent, but no Jewish ancestry has been discovered.

Education and early career 
The young Rosenberg graduated from the Petri-Realschule (currently Tallinna Reaalkool) and went on to study architecture at the Riga Polytechnical Institute and engineering at Moscow's Imperial Higher Technical School , completing his PhD studies in 1917. During his stays at home in Reval, he attended the art studio of the famed painter Ants Laikmaa - though he showed promise, there are no records that he ever exhibited.

During the German occupation of Estonia in 1918, Rosenberg served as a drawing teacher at the Gustav Adolf Gymnasium  and Tallinna Reaalkool (current Tallinn Polytechnic School). He gave his first speech on Jewish Marxism on 30 November, at the House of the Blackheads, after the 28 November 1918 outbreak of the Estonian War of Independence. He emigrated to Germany with the retreating Imperial German army, along with Max Scheubner-Richter, who served as something of a mentor to Rosenberg and to his ideology. Arriving in Munich, he contributed to Dietrich Eckart's publication, the Völkischer Beobachter (Ethnic/Nationalist Observer). By this time, he was both an antisemite – influenced by Houston Stewart Chamberlain's book The Foundations of the Nineteenth Century, one of the key proto-Nazi books of racial theory – and an anti-Bolshevik. Rosenberg became one of the earliest members of the German Workers' Party – later renamed the National Socialist German Workers' Party, better known as the Nazi Party – joining in January 1919, eight months before Adolf Hitler joined in September. According to some historians, Rosenberg had also been a member of the Thule Society, along with Eckart, although Nicholas Goodrick-Clarke contends that they were only guests. After the Völkischer Beobachter became the Nazi party newspaper in December 1920, Rosenberg became its editor in 1923. Rosenberg was a leading member of Aufbau Vereinigung, Reconstruction Organisation, a conspiratorial organisation of White Russian émigrés which had a critical influence on early Nazi policy.

Rosenberg sympathized and identified with Talat Pasha and the Committee of Union and Progress that carried out the Armenian genocide, also claiming that there was "a deliberately Jewish policy which had always protected the Armenians" and that "during the world war, the Armenians have led the espionage against the Turks, similar to the Jews against Germany".

Nazi party
In 1923, after the failed Beer Hall Putsch, Hitler, who had been imprisoned for treason, appointed Rosenberg as the leader of the Nazi movement. Hitler remarked privately in later years that his choice of Rosenberg, whom he regarded as weak and lazy, was strategic; Hitler did not want the temporary leader of the Nazis to become too popular or hungry for power, because a person with either of those two qualities might not want to cede the party leadership after Hitler's release. However, at the time of the appointment Hitler had no reason to believe that he would soon be released, and Rosenberg had not appeared weak, so this may have been Hitler reading back into history his dissatisfaction with Rosenberg for the job he did.

On 1 January 1924, Rosenberg founded the Greater German People's Community, a Nazi front organization. Headquartered in Munich, it was largely limited to Bavaria, the birthplace of National Socialism, had no substantial presence outside that State and became a haven for Nazi Party members from that area. Prominent members included Max Amann, Phillip Bouhler, Hermann Esser, Franz Xaver Schwarz and Julius Streicher.  Rosenberg, one of the least charismatic of the Nazi leaders and lacking in leadership qualities, was soon pushed aside by Streicher, a far more ruthless and abrasive personality, who was elected Chairman on 9 July 1924 with Esser, also a coarse, bullying sort, as his Deputy Chairman.

In 1929 Rosenberg founded the Militant League for German Culture. He later formed the "Institute for Research on the Jewish Question", the first branch of a projected Advanced School of the NSDAP, dedicated to identifying and attacking Jewish influence in German culture and to recording the history of Judaism from a radical nationalist perspective. He was elected as a Reichstag Deputy in 1930 and would continue to serve in this capacity until the end of the Nazi regime. First elected as a representative of the electoral list, from 1933 on he represented electoral constituency 33, Hesse. In 1930, he also published his book on racial theory The Myth of the Twentieth Century (Der Mythus des 20. Jahrhunderts) which deals with key issues in the Nazi ideology, such as the "Jewish question." Rosenberg intended his book as a sequel to Houston Stewart Chamberlain's above-cited book.  Despite selling more than a million copies by 1945, its influence within Nazism remains doubtful. It is often said to have been a book that was officially venerated within Nazism, but one that few had actually read beyond the first chapter or even found comprehensible. Hitler called it "stuff nobody can understand" and disapproved of its pseudo-religious tone.

Rosenberg helped convince Hitler, whose early speeches focused on revenge against France and Britain, that communism was a serious threat to Germany. "Jewish-Bolshevism" became an ideological target for Nazism during the early 1920s.

In Rome during November 1932 Rosenberg participated in the Volta Conference about Europe. British historian Sir Charles Petrie met him there and regarded him with great distaste; Petrie was a Catholic and strongly objected to Rosenberg's anti-Jewish and anti-Catholic sentiments.

The following year, following the Nazi seizure of power, Rosenberg was named leader of the Nazi Party's Foreign Policy Office in April, and on 2 June 1933 he was named a Reichsleiter, the second highest political rank in the Nazi Party. In May 1933 Rosenberg visited Britain, to give the impression that the Nazis would not be a threat and to encourage links between the new regime and the British Empire. It was a notable failure. When Rosenberg laid a wreath bearing a swastika at the Cenotaph, a Labour Party candidate slashed it, later threw it in the Thames and was fined 40 shillings for willful damage at Bow Street magistrate's court.

In October 1933, Rosenberg was named as a member of Hans Frank's Academy for German Law. Then on 27 January 1934, Hitler made Rosenberg the "Führer's Representative for the Supervision of Intellectual and Ideological Education of the NSDAP." This was the origin of the Amt Rosenberg.

Racial theories

As the Nazi Party's chief racial theorist, Rosenberg oversaw the construction of a human racial "ladder" that justified Hitler's racial and ethnic policies. Rosenberg built on the works of Arthur de Gobineau, Houston Stewart Chamberlain, Madison Grant and the Klansman Lothrop Stoddard as well as on the beliefs of Hitler. Rosenberg placed Blacks and Jews at the very bottom of the ladder, while at the very top stood the "Aryan" race. Rosenberg promoted the Nordic theory which considered the Nordic race the "master race", superior to all others, including to other Aryans (Indo-Europeans). He was also influenced by the Judeo-Masonic conspiracy theory promoted by the Catholic counter-revolutionary tradition, such as the book Le Juif, le judaïsme et la judaïsation des peuples chrétiens (1869) by Roger Gougenot des Mousseaux, which he translated into German under the title The Eternal Jew.

Rosenberg got the racial term Untermensch from the title of Stoddard's 1922 book The Revolt Against Civilization: The Menace of the Under-man, which had been adopted by the Nazis from that book's German version Der Kulturumsturz: Die Drohung des Untermenschen (1925).

Rosenberg reshaped the Nazi racial policy over the years, but it always consisted of Aryan supremacy, extreme German nationalism and rabid antisemitism. Rosenberg also outspokenly opposed homosexuality – notably in his pamphlet "Der Sumpf" ("The Swamp", 1927). He viewed homosexuality as a hindrance to the expansion of the Nordic population.

Rosenberg's attitude towards Slavs was flexible because it depended on the particular nation which he referred to. As a result of the ideology of "Drang nach Osten" ("Drive to the East"), Rosenberg saw his mission as the conquest and colonization of the Slavic East. In Der Mythus des 20. Jahrhunderts Rosenberg describes Russian Slavs as being overwhelmed by Bolshevism. Regarding Ukrainians, he favoured setting up a buffer state to ease the pressure on the German eastern frontier, while agreeing with the notion that Russia could be exploited for the benefit of Germany. During the war, Rosenberg was in favour of collaboration with the East Slavs against Bolshevism and offering them national independence unlike other Nazis such as Hitler and Himmler who dismissed such ideas.

Religious theories

Rosenberg was raised as a Protestant, but he rejected Christianity later in his life. Rosenberg argued for a new "religion of the blood", based on the supposed innate promptings of the Nordic soul to defend its noble character against racial and cultural degeneration.

In his 1920 book Immorality in the Talmud, Rosenberg identified Jews with the antichrist. He rejected Christianity for its universality, for its doctrine of original sin (at least for Germans who he declared on one occasion were born noble), and for its teachings on the immortality of the soul, saying, "indeed, absorbing Christianity enfeebled a people." Publicly, Rosenberg affected to deplore Christianity's degeneration owing to Jewish influence.  Following Houston Stewart Chamberlain's ideas, he condemned what he called "negative Christianity" (the orthodox beliefs of the Protestant and Catholic churches), arguing for a so-called "positive" Christianity based on Chamberlain's argument that Jesus was a member of an Indo-European, Nordic enclave which was resident in ancient Galilee who struggled against Judaism. Significantly, in his work explicating the Nazi intellectual belief system, The Myth of the Twentieth Century, Rosenberg cryptically alludes to and lauds the early Christian heretic Marcion (who rejected the Old Testament as well as the notion of Christ as the Jewish Messiah) and the Manichaean-inspired, "Aryo-Iranian" Cathari, as being the more authentic interpreters of Christianity versus historically dominant Judaeo-Christianity; moreover these ancient, externally Christian metaphysical forms were more "organically compatible with the Nordic sense of the spiritual and the Nordic 'blood-soul'." For Rosenberg, the anti-intellectual, religious doctrine was inseparable from serving the interests of the Nordic race, connecting the individual to his racial nature. Rosenberg stated that "The general ideas of the Roman and of the Protestant churches are negative Christianity and do not, therefore, accord with our (German) soul." His support for Luther as a great German figure was always ambivalent.

In January 1934, Hitler appointed Rosenberg cultural and educational leader of the Reich. The Sanctum Officium in Rome recommended that Rosenberg's Myth of the Twentieth Century be put on the Index Librorum Prohibitorum (list of books forbidden by the Catholic Church) for scorning and rejecting "all dogmas of the Catholic Church, indeed the very fundamentals of the Christian religion".
During World War II, Rosenberg outlined the future envisioned by the Hitler government for religion in Germany, with a thirty-point program for the future of the German churches. Among its articles:

 the National Reich Church of Germany would claim exclusive control over all churches
 publication of the Bible would cease
 crucifixes, Bibles and saints were to be removed from altars
 Mein Kampf would be placed on altars as "to the German nation and therefore to God the most sacred book"
 the Christian Cross would be removed from all churches and replaced with the swastika.

Rosenberg has been described as an atheist by people, including Henry F. Gerecke, the Lutheran chaplain who communed with some of the Nuremberg prisoners, including Joachim von Ribbentrop and Wilhelm Keitel. However, some historians have claimed that Rosenberg was a neo-pagan.

Wartime activities

In 1940 Rosenberg was made head of the Hohe Schule (literally "high school", but the German phrase refers to a college), the Centre of National Socialist Ideological and Educational Research, out of which the Einsatzstab Reichsleiter Rosenberg (Reichsleiter Rosenberg Taskforce) developed for the purpose of looting art and cultural goods. The ERR were especially active in Paris in looting art stolen from famous Jewish families such as the Rothschilds and that of Paul Rosenberg. Hermann Göring used the ERR to collect art for his own personal gratification.
He created a "Special Task Force for Music" (Sonderstab Musik) to collect the best musical instruments and scores for use in a university to be built in Hitler's home town of Linz, Austria. The orders given to the Sonderstab Musik were to loot all forms of Jewish property in Germany and of those found in any country taken over by the German army, and any musical instruments or scores were to be immediately shipped to Berlin.

Reich Minister for the Occupied Eastern Territories
Following the invasion of the USSR, Rosenberg was appointed head of the Reich Ministry for the Occupied Eastern Territories (Reichsministerium für die besetzten Ostgebiete) on 17 July 1941. Alfred Meyer served as his deputy and represented him at the Wannsee Conference. Another official of the Ministry, Georg Leibbrandt, also attended the conference, at Rosenberg's request.

Rosenberg had presented Hitler with his plan for the organization of the conquered Eastern territories, suggesting the establishment of new administrative districts, to replace the previously Soviet-controlled territories with new Reichskommissariats. These would be:

 Ostland (Baltic countries and Belarus),
 Ukraine (Ukraine and nearest territories),
 Kaukasus (Caucasus area),
 Moskau (Moscow metropolitan area and the rest of nearest Russian European areas)

Although Rosenberg believed that all of the peoples of the Soviet Union were subhumans because of their communist beliefs, such suggestions were intended to encourage certain non-Russian forms of nationalism and promote German interests for the benefit of future Aryan generations, in accord with geopolitical "Lebensraum im Osten" plans. They would provide a buffer against Soviet expansion in preparation for the total eradication of Communism and Bolshevism by decisive pre-emptive military action.

Following these plans, when Wehrmacht forces invaded Soviet-controlled territory, they immediately implemented the first of the proposed Reichskommissariats of Ostland and Ukraine, under the leadership of Hinrich Lohse and Erich Koch, respectively. The organization of these administrative territories led to conflict between Rosenberg and the SS over the treatment of Slavs under German occupation. As Nazi Germany's chief racial theorist, Rosenberg considered Slavs, though lesser than Germans, to be Aryan. Rosenberg often complained to Hitler and Himmler about the treatment of non-Jewish occupied peoples. He proposed the creation of buffer satellite states made out of Greater Finland, Baltica, Ukraine, and Caucasus.

During an 18 November 1941 press conference, he made the following statements about the Jewish question:

At the Nuremberg trials he said he was ignorant of the Holocaust, despite the fact that Leibbrandt and Meyer were present at the Wannsee conference.

Wartime propaganda efforts

Since the invasion of the Soviet Union intended to impose the New Order, it was essentially a war of conquest. German propaganda efforts designed to win over Russian opinion were, at best, patchy and inconsistent. Alfred Rosenberg was one of the few in the Nazi hierarchy who advocated a policy designed to encourage anti-Communist opinion among the population of the occupied territories. His interest here was mainly in the non-Russian areas such as Ukraine and the Baltic States; however, supporters of the Russian Liberation Army were somewhat able to win him over.

Amongst other things, Rosenberg issued a series of posters announcing the end of the Soviet collective farms (kolkhoz). He also issued an Agrarian Law in February 1942, annulling all Soviet legislation on farming and restoring family farms for those willing to collaborate with the occupiers. But decollectivisation conflicted with the wider demands of wartime food production, and Hermann Göring demanded that the collective farms be retained, save for a change of name. Hitler himself denounced the redistribution of land as "stupid".

There were numerous German armed forces (Wehrmacht) posters asking for assistance in the Bandenkrieg, the war against the Soviet partisans, though, once again, German policy had the effect of adding to their problems. Posters for "volunteer" labour, with inscriptions such as "Come work with us to shorten the war", hid the appalling realities faced by Russian workers in Germany.  Rosenberg noted that many joined the partisans when volunteers for work details declined and the Germans resorted to force to acquire workers from the East.

Another of Rosenberg's initiatives, the "Free Caucasus" campaign, was rather more successful, attracting various nationalities into the so-called Eastern Legion (Ostlegionen), though in the end this made little difference in the outcome of the war on the Eastern Front.

Trial and execution

Rosenberg was captured by Allied troops on 19 May 1945 in Flensburg-Mürwik. He was tried at Nuremberg and found guilty of all four counts: conspiracy to commit crimes against peace; planning, initiating and waging wars of aggression; war crimes; and crimes against humanity. The final judgment against him named him one of the principal planners of the invasion of Norway and the invasion of the Soviet Union. It also held him directly responsible for the systematic plunder of the occupied countries of Europe, as well as the brutal conditions in Eastern Europe. During his trial he wrote his memoirs, which were published posthumously and with analytical commentary by Serge Lang and Ernst von Schenck.

He was sentenced to death and executed with other condemned co-defendants at Nuremberg Prison on the morning of 16 October 1946. His body, like those of the other nine executed men and that of Hermann Göring, was cremated at Ostfriedhof (Munich) and the ashes were scattered in the river Isar.

Throughout the trial, it was agreed that Rosenberg had a decisive role in shaping Nazi philosophy and ideology. Examples include: his book The Myth of the Twentieth Century, which was published in 1930, where he incited hatred against "Liberal Imperialism" and "Bolshevik Marxism"; furthering the influence of the "Lebensraum" idea in Germany during the war; facilitating the persecution of Christian churches and the Jews in particular; and opposition to the Versailles Treaty.

According to Joseph Kingsbury-Smith, who covered the executions for the International News Service, Rosenberg was the only condemned man who, when asked at the gallows if he had any last statement to make, replied with only one word: "No".

Nazi policy and Rosenberg's views
Hitler was a leader oriented towards practical politics, whereas, for Rosenberg, religion and philosophy were key and he was the most culturally influential within the party. Several accounts of the time before the Nazi ascension to power speak of Hitler as being a mouthpiece for Rosenberg's views, and he clearly exerted a great deal of intellectual influence.

The question of Rosenberg's influence in the Nazi Party is controversial. He was perceived as lacking the charisma and political skills of the other Nazi leaders, and was somewhat isolated. In some of his speeches Hitler appeared to be close to Rosenberg's views, rejecting traditional Christianity as a religion based on Jewish culture, preferring an ethnically and culturally pure "Race" whose destiny was supposed to be assigned to the German people by "Providence". But Hitler rejected Rosenberg's spiritual views on race but instead based his views on biology.

After Hitler's assumption of power he moved to unify the churches into a national church which could be manipulated and controlled. He placed himself in the position of being the man to save Positive Christianity from utter destruction at the hands of the atheistic antitheist Communists of the Soviet Union. This was especially true immediately before and after the elections of 1932; Hitler wanted to appear non-threatening to major Christian faiths and consolidate his power.

Some Nazi leaders, such as Martin Bormann, were anti-Christian and sympathetic to Rosenberg. Once in power, Hitler and most Nazi leaders sought to unify the Christian denominations in favor of "positive Christianity". Hitler privately condemned mystical and pseudoreligious interests as "nonsense",  and maintained that National Socialism was based on science and should avoid mystic and cultic practices.  However, he and Joseph Goebbels agreed that after the Endsieg (Final Victory) the Reich Church should be pressed into evolving into a German social evolutionist organisation proclaiming the cult of race, blood and battle, instead of Redemption and the Ten Commandments of Moses, which they deemed outdated and Jewish.

Heinrich Himmler's views were among the closest to Rosenberg's, and their estrangement was perhaps created by Himmler's abilities to put into action what Rosenberg had only written. Also, while Rosenberg thought Christianity should be allowed to die out, Himmler actively set out to create countering pagan rituals.

Lieutenant Colonel William Harold Dunn (1898–1955) wrote a medical and psychiatric report on him in prison to evaluate him as a suicide risk: He gave the impression of clinging to his own theories in a fanatical and unyielding fashion and to have been little influenced by the unfolding during the trial of the cruelty and crimes of the party.

Summarizing the unresolved conflict between the personal views of Rosenberg and the pragmatism of the Nazi elite:
The ruthless pursuit of Nazi aims turned out to mean not, as Rosenberg had hoped, the permeation of German life with the new ideology; it meant concentration of the combined resources of party and state on total war.

Family life
Rosenberg was married twice.  In 1915, he married Hilda Leesmann, an ethnic Estonian; they divorced in 1923. Two years later, in 1925 he married Hedwig Kramer, to whom he remained wed until his execution by the Allies. He and Kramer had two children: a son who died in infancy and a daughter, Irene, who was born in 1930. His wife died in 1947.

Writings
 Unmoral im Talmud, 1920, Ernst Boepple's Deutscher Volksverlag, Munich ("Immorality in the Talmud")
 Das Verbrechen der Freimaurerei: Judentum, Jesuitismus, Deutsches Christentum, 1921 ("The Crime of Freemasonry: Judaism, Jesuitism, German Christianity")
 Wesen, Grundsätze und Ziele der Nationalsozialistischen Deutschen Arbeiterpartei, 1922, Ernst Boepple's Deutscher Volksverlag, Munich ("Being, principles, and goals of the National Socialist German Worker's Party")
 Pest in Russland. Der Bolschewismus, seine Häupter, Handlanger und Opfer, 1922, Ernst Boepple's Deutscher Volksverlag, Munich ("The Plague in Russia. Bolshevism, its heads, henchmen, and victims")
 Bolschewismus, Hunger, Tod, 1922, Ernst Boepple's Deutscher Volksverlag, Munich ("Bolshevism, hunger, death")
 Der staatsfeindliche Zionismus. ("Zionism, the Enemy of the State"), 1922.
 Die Protokolle der Weisen von Zion und die jüdische Weltpolitik, 1923 ("The Protocols of the Elders of Zion and the Jewish World Politics")
 The Jewish Bolshevism, Britons Pub. Society, 1923, together with Ernst Boepple
 Der Mythus des 20. Jahrhunderts, 1930 ("The Myth of the 20th Century")
 Dietrich Eckart. Ein Vermächtnis, 1935 ("Dietrich Eckart: A Legacy")
 An die Dunkelmänner unserer Zeit. Eine Antwort auf die Angriffe gegen den "Mythus des 20. Jahrhunderts", 1937 ("The Obscurantists of Our Time: A Response to the Attacks Against 'The Myth of the 20th Century'")
 Protestantische Rompilger. Der Verrat an Luther und der "Mythus des 20. Jahrhunderts", 1937 ("Protestant Rome Pilgrims: The Betrayal of Luther and the 'Myth of the 20th Century'")
 Portrait eines Menschheitsverbrechers, 1949, with analytical commentary by Serge Lang and Ernst von Schenck ("Memoirs of Alfred Rosenberg: With Commentaries")
 Die Macht der Form, Unknown ("The Power of Form")

Diary
During the Nuremberg trials, Rosenberg's handwritten diary was translated by Harry Fiss, Chief of Documentation for the American prosecution. After its use in evidence during the Nuremberg trials, the diary went missing, along with other material which had been given to the prosecutor Robert Kempner (1899–1993). It was recovered in Lewiston, N.Y., on 13 June 2013. Written on 425 loose-leaf pages, with entries dating from 1936 through 1944, it is now the property of the United States Holocaust Memorial Museum (USHMM) in Washington. Henry Mayer, the museum's senior archivist, and the son of a Holocaust survivor, was able to access the material and while "not given enough time to read [the] diary entry from beginning to end," he "could see that Rosenberg focused on certain subjects, including brutality against Jews and other ethnic groups and forcing the civilian population of occupied Russia to serve Germany." Meyer also noted Rosenberg's "hostile comments about Nazi leaders," which he described as "unvarnished." While some parts of the manuscript had been previously published, the majority had been lost for decades. Former Federal Bureau of Investigation agent Robert King Wittman, who helped track down the diary, said, "there is no place in the diary where we have Rosenberg or Hitler saying the Jews should be exterminated, all it said was 'move them out of Europe'". The New York Times said of the search for the missing manuscript that "the tangled journey of the diary could itself be the subject of a television mini-series."
Since the end of 2013, the USHMM has shown the 425-page document (photos and transcripts) on its homepage.

See also
 Antisemitism
 Myth of the Twentieth Century
 Nordische Gesellschaft
 Racism
 Kirchenkampf

References
Informational notes

Citations

Bibliography

External links

 
 Personal diary found by ICE 13 June 2013  
 Alfred Rosenberg Memoirs at Archive.org
United States Holocaust Memorial Museum – Alfred Rosenberg
 
 Rosenberg on Churchill
 Alfred Rosenberg - photo
 Great Grandchild  Tytus L Rosenberg
 Rosenberg on Nuremberg Rally
 Chapter V, Faith and Thought in National Socialist Germany, The War Against the West, Aurel Kolnai
 
 

1893 births
1946 deaths
Anti-Masonry
Anti-Catholic activists
Anti-Catholicism in Germany
Antisemitism in Germany
Architects in the Nazi Party
Baltic-German people
Bauman Moscow State Technical University alumni
Critics of Christianity
Critics of the Catholic Church
Estonian architects
Executed Estonian people
Executed German people
Fascist writers
Former Protestants
German anti-communists
German atheists
German conspiracy theorists
German former Christians
German male non-fiction writers
German modern pagans
German propagandists
German people convicted of crimes against humanity
German people convicted of the international crime of aggression
German people of Estonian descent
German people of French descent
German people of Latvian descent
German political philosophers
German political writers
German Workers Party members
Greater German People's Community politicians
Holocaust perpetrators
Kirchenkampf
Members of the Academy for German Law
Members of the Reichstag of Nazi Germany
Members of the Reichstag of the Weimar Republic
Militant League for German Culture members
Nazi Germany ministers
Nazi Party officials
Nazi Party politicians
Nazi propagandists
Nazis convicted of war crimes
Nazis from outside Germany
Nazis who participated in the Beer Hall Putsch
People executed by the International Military Tribunal in Nuremberg
People executed for crimes against humanity
People from the Governorate of Estonia
Political philosophers
Politicians from Tallinn
Pseudoarchaeologists
Pseudohistorians
Reichsleiters
Riga Technical University alumni
Sturmabteilung officers
Thule Society members
20th-century German architects
20th-century German philosophers
20th-century German writers